Carmine R. DiBartholomeo, better known as Carmen Barth (September 13, 1912 – September 17, 1985), was a male American boxer who competed in the 1932 Summer Olympics. He was born and raised in the Collinwood neighborhood of Cleveland, Ohio and died in Lorain, Ohio.

Amateur career
In 1931 Barth won 160 Lb Amateur Title of Cleveland. In 1932 he won the gold medal in the middleweight class after winning the final against Amado Azar.

1932 Olympic Results

Below are the results of Carmen Barth, an American middleweight boxer who competed at the 1932 Los Angeles Olympics:

 Round of 16: bye
 Quarterfinal: defeated Manuel Cruz (Mexico) second-round knockout
 Semifinal: defeated Ernest Peirce (South Africa) by decision
 Final: defeated Amado Azar (Argentina) by decision (won gold medal)

References
 
 

1912 births
1985 deaths
Boxers from Ohio
Middleweight boxers
Olympic boxers of the United States
Boxers at the 1932 Summer Olympics
Olympic gold medalists for the United States in boxing
Sportspeople from Lorain, Ohio
American male boxers
Medalists at the 1932 Summer Olympics